Ghatsa pillaii also known as the Silent Valley loach is a species of ray-finned fish in the genus Ghatsa.

References

Fish described in 1981